The Maltese is a breed of domestic goat from the east and central Mediterranean area. It originates in Asia Minor, and takes its name from the island of Malta. It is raised mainly in southern Italy, and particularly in the islands of Sicily and Sardinia. The Maltese is also present in Greece, Turkey and the Maghreb.

Characteristics

The Maltese is a long-haired white goat characterised by a raven-black area on the top and sides of the head and long pendulous black ears which turn outwards at the tip.

Registration and numbers

In Italy, the Maltese is one of the eight autochthonous Italian goat breeds for which a genealogical herdbook is kept by the Associazione Nazionale della Pastorizia, the Italian national association of sheep- and goat-breeders. The herdbook was established in 1976. The Italian population of the breed was estimated in 1983 to be about 70,000, and in 2005 at 40,000. At the end of 2013 the registered population reported was 1934.

Use

The Maltese is a valued milk breed; the milk has pleasant taste without an excessively "goaty" odour or flavour. The milk has an average of 4.28% fat and 3.66% protein. In Sicily the milk is used to make ricotta and traditional caprino cheeses including Padduni, which has PAT status, and Formaggiu ri crapa. 

References

Goat breeds
Dairy goat breeds
Goat breeds originating in Italy